Hoja En Blanco (Blank Sheet) is Monchy & Alexandra's debut album. The album contains the hit single, "Hoja En Blanco". It was originally written and performed by the Colombian vallenato band, Los Diablitos.

Track listing

Charts

References

1999 albums
Monchy & Alexandra albums